The Philadelphia Phillies are a Major League Baseball team based in Philadelphia, Pennsylvania. They  are a member of the Eastern Division of Major League Baseball's National League. The team has played officially under two names since beginning play in 1883: the current moniker, as well as the "Quakers", which was used in conjunction with "Phillies" during the team's early history. The team was also known unofficially as the "Blue Jays" during the World War II era. Since the franchise's inception,  players have made an appearance in a competitive game for the team, whether as an offensive player (batting and baserunning) or a defensive player (fielding, pitching, or both).

Of those  Phillies, 33 have had surnames beginning with the letter N, and 26 beginning with the letter O. One member of this list has been inducted into the Baseball Hall of Fame; pitcher Kid Nichols played two seasons for the Phillies (1905–1906). No Phillies players with surnames beginning with N or O have been inducted into the Philadelphia Baseball Wall of Fame; however, Paul Owens was a team manager, general manager, and executive from 1972 to 2003. No members of this list hold franchise records, nor have any numbers been retired for them.

Among the 33 batters in this list, Lefty O'Doul has the highest batting average, at .391; he played for the Phillies during the 1929 and 1930 seasons. Other players with an average over .300 include Lou Novikoff (.304 in one season; the only player whose surname begins with N to bat over .300), Dink O'Brien (.333 in one season), and Al Oliver (.312 in one season). Ron Northey leads all members of this list with 60 home runs and 273 runs batted in; among players whose surname begins with O, O'Doul leads with 54 and 219, respectively.

Of this list's 28 pitchers, three share the best win–loss record, in terms of winning percentage: Red Nelson, Jerry Nops, and Eddie Oropesa each have a 1.000 winning percentage, Nelson having won two games and lost none, and Nops and Oropesa each winning one game without a loss. Al Orth, in his seven seasons as a Phillies, accumulated 100 victories and 72 defeats, tops in both categories on this list; among pitchers whose surname begins with N, Nichols' 10 wins and Dickie Noles' 11 losses are highest. Orth and Noles also lead their respective lists in strikeouts: Orth with 359, and Noles with 133. Roy Oswalt's 1.74 earned run average (ERA) is the lowest among members of this list; of the pitchers whose surname begins with N, Nichols' 2.83 ERA is best.

One player, Jack Neagle, has made 30% or more of his Phillies appearances as a pitcher and a position player. He amassed a 1–7 pitching record with a 6.90 ERA while batting in four runs as a left fielder.

Footnotes
Key
 The National Baseball Hall of Fame and Museum determines which cap a player wears on their plaque, signifying "the team with which he made his most indelible mark". The Hall of Fame considers the player's wishes in making their decision, but the Hall makes the final decision as "it is important that the logo be emblematic of the historical accomplishments of that player's career".
 Players are listed at a position if they appeared in 30% of their games or more during their Phillies career, as defined by Baseball-Reference.com. Additional positions may be shown on the Baseball-Reference website by following each player's citation.
 Franchise batting and pitching leaders are drawn from Baseball-Reference.com. A total of 1,500 plate appearances are needed to qualify for batting records, and 500 innings pitched or 50 decisions are required to qualify for pitching records.
 Statistics are correct as of the end of the 2010 Major League Baseball season.

Table
Joe O'Rourke is listed by Baseball-Reference without a position; he appeared in three career games in 1929.

References
General

Inline citations

NO